Zarrin Rural District is in Kharanaq District of Ardakan County, Yazd province, Iran. At the National Census of 2006, its population was 866 in 289 households. There were 762 inhabitants in 206 households at the following census of 2011. At the most recent census of 2016, the population of the rural district was 553 in 169 households. The largest of its 64 villages was Hajjiabad-e Zarrin, with 178 people.

References 

Ardakan County

Rural Districts of Yazd Province

Populated places in Yazd Province

Populated places in Ardakan County